The Melanommataceae are a family of fungi in the order Pleosporales. Taxa are widespread in temperate and subtropical regions, and are saprobic on wood and bark.

Genera
These are the genera that are in the Melanommataceae (including estimated number of species in each genus, totalling 1017 species), according to a 2021 review of fungal classification. Following the genus name is the taxonomic authority (those who first circumscribed the genus; standardised author abbreviations are used), year of publication, and the estimated number of species.
 Alpinaria  – 1 sp.
 Aposphaeria  – 189 spp.
 Asymmetricospora  – 1 sp.
 Bertiella  – 2 spp.
 Bicrouania  – 1 sp.
 Byssosphaeria  – 27 spp.
 Calyptronectria  – 3 spp.
 Camposporium  – 24 spp.
 Exosporiella  – 1 sp.
 Fusiconidium  – 3 spp.
 Herpotrichia  – 101 spp.
 Mamillisphaeria  – 1 sp.
 Marjia  – 1 sp.
 Melanocamarosporioides  – 1 sp.
 Melanocamarosporium  – 2 spp.
 Melanocucurbitaria  – 1 sp.
 Melanodiplodia  – 1 sp.
 Melanomma  – ca. 30 spp.
 Monoseptella  – 1 sp.
 Muriformistrickeria  – 2 spp.
 Navicella  – 5 spp.
 Neobyssosphaeria  – 1 sp.
 Petrakia  – 6 spp.
 Phragmotrichum  – 5 spp.
 Pleotrichocladium  – 1 sp.
 Praetumpfia  – 1 sp.
 Pseudobyssosphaeria  – 1 sp.
 Pseudodidymella  – 2 spp.
 Pseudostrickeria  – 3 spp.
 Sarimanas  – 2 spp.
 Seifertia  – 2 spp.
 Tumularia  – 2 spp.
 Uzbekistanica  – 3 spp.
 Xenostigmina  – 2 spp.

References

 
Dothideomycetes families
Taxa described in 1885